Job is a major figure in the Bible. People with the same given name include:

 Patriarch Job of Alexandria, Greek Patriarch of Alexandria from 954 to 960
 Job of Esztergom, Hungarian prelate and archbishop (1185–1204)
 Patriarch Job of Moscow (died 1607), first Patriarch of Moscow and All Russia and a saint of the Orthodox Church
 Job of Pochayiv (c. 1551 – 1651), Ukrainian Orthodox monk and Eastern Orthodox saint
 Job (Osacky) (1946–2009), archbishop of the Orthodox Church
 Job Adriaenszoon Berckheyde (1630–1698), Dutch painter
 Sir Job Charlton, 1st Baronet (c. 1614–1697), barrister, member and briefly Speaker of the House of Commons of England, and judge
 Job Charnock (c. 1630–1692), English East India Company administrator traditionally regarded as the founder of the city of Calcutta
 Job Cohen (born 1947), leader of the Dutch Labour Party
 Job Durfee (1790–1847), jurist and member of the Rhode Island House of Representatives
 Job Harriman (1861–1925), vice presidential candidate for the Socialist Party of America and founder of a utopian community
 Job Dean Jessop (1926–2001), American jockey
 Job Koech Kinyor (born 1990), Kenyan middle-distance runner
 Job Mann (1795–1873), member of the U.S. House of Representatives from Pennsylvania
 Job de Roincé (1896–1981), French journalist and writer
 Job ben Solomon or Ayuba Suleiman Diallo (1701–1773), Muslim transported to America as a slave
 Job Tausinga (born 1951), Minister for Education and Human Resources Development of the Solomon Islands
 Job Throckmorton (1545–1601), English religious pamphleteer and Member of Parliament

See also
 Eyüp (name), Turkish variant
 Ayub (name), Arabic variant

English masculine given names
Hebrew masculine given names
Masculine given names